Melek is a village in the Nitra District, Slovakia.

Melek may also refer to:

People

Given name
 Melek Sina Baydur (born 1948), Turkish retired diplomat and former Ambassador of Turkey 
 Melek Bilge (born 1989), Turkish professional female basketball player
 Melek Hu (born 1989),  Chinese-born Turkish table tennis player
 Melek Taus, a central figure of the Yazidi religion
 Melek Tourhan (1869–1956), Queen consort of Egypt

Surname
 Abdurrahman Melek (1896–1978), prime minister of the Republic of Hatay

Epithet
 Melek Ahmed Pasha (c. 1604–1662), Ottoman grand vizier
  (died 1685), Ottoman governor of Egypt, also known as Şeytan Ibrahim Pasha
  (1719–1802), Ottoman grand vizier and grand admiral

Music
 Melek (album), an album by Candan Erçetin

See also
 Malak (disambiguation)

Arabic feminine given names
Turkish feminine given names